Whitefield is an upcoming metro station in Bangalore, India. It is the eastern terminal metro station on the east-west corridor of the Purple Line of Namma Metro. This station serves the Whitefield neighbourhood area. Around this station, is the Whitefield railway station followed by some locations like Kadugodi Bus Terminus, BSNL Telephone Service Center, Sri Sathya Sai Baba Ashram and many more.

The Whitefield - KR Puram trial runs were successfully conducted from 25 October for a month. This section will become operational from March 25 2023.

Station Layout
Station Layout - To Be Confirmed

Connections
Metro station is connected with Whitefield of Indian Railways network.

Entry/Exit

See also
Whitefield, Bangalore
Bangalore
Whitefield railway station
List of Namma Metro stations
Transport in Karnataka
List of metro systems
List of rapid transit systems in India
Bangalore Metropolitan Transport Corporation

References

External links
 BMRCL English - BMRCL Official Website



Namma Metro stations
Railway stations in India opened in 2011
2011 establishments in Karnataka